Epharmottomena eremophila is a moth of the family Noctuidae first described by Hans Rebel in 1895. It is found from Morocco and the western parts of the Sahara, to Sinai, Israel and Syria.

There are probably two generations per year. Adults are on wing in from September to April.

External links

Image

Calpinae
Moths of the Middle East
Moths described in 1895